The Order of Saint Anthony was a Bavarian military order founded in 1382 by Duke Albert of Bavaria.

History
The Order of Saint Anthony was created in 1382, after Duke Albert had pledged to go to war with the Ottoman Empire.

Uniform
The knights of Order of Saint Anthony wore a gold collar, from which hung a crutch and a little bell.

References

Citations

Books

See also

 Order of Saint Anthony (Ethiopia)

Anthony
Anthony
Duchy of Bavaria
1382 establishments in Europe
1380s establishments in the Holy Roman Empire